Mahanagar is a 1963 Indian Bengali-language drama film written and directed by Satyajit Ray. Starring Madhabi Mukherjee in the leading role and based on the short story Abataranika by Narendranath Mitra, it tells the story of a housewife who disconcerts her traditionalist family by getting the job of a saleswoman. The film marked the first screen appearance of Jaya Bhaduri, one of Hindi cinema's leading actresses.

Shot in the first half of 1963 in Calcutta, this was also the first film directed by Ray set entirely in his native Calcutta, reflecting contemporary realities of the urban middle-class, where women going to work is no longer merely driven by ideas of emancipation but has become an economic reality. The film examines the effects of the confident working woman on patriarchial attitudes and social dynamics. Besides The Apu Trilogy,  the film, according to veteran film critic Philip French, is one of Ray's greatest films.

Plot
Set in Calcutta during the 1950s, Mahanagar explores the evolving independence of middle-class women of the city. Arati (Madhabi Mukherjee), a homemaker, takes a job as a door-to-door saleswoman to meet the increasing financial pressure on her orthodox and conservative family, who share a cramped apartment. Despite the disapproval of her father-in-law, Priyogopal (Haren Chatterjee), the hesitant and nervous Arati soon begins to prosper in her field and gradually starts to enjoy her new-found financial and psychological independence.

Her begrudgingly supportive husband, Subrata (Anil Chatterjee), starts to feel insecure and asks Arati to quit her job after he tentatively secures another part-time job. Before Arati can quit, Subrata loses his full-time job when the bank he was working for shuts down in the last of the Calcutta bank crashes. Subrata has no choice but to let Arati continue to work.

Arati now becomes the sole breadwinner of the family. She befriends an Anglo-Indian colleague, Edith (Vicky Redwood), a move which raises suspicion and increases conflict within her family. Slowly Arati begins to shine in her job and earn the trust of her manager, who promises her more responsibilities if she continues to work with efficiency.

Priyogopal, a retired schoolteacher, visits several of his former pupils who are now prospering in their chosen professions to solicit funds (after refusing to accept money from Arati). One of them, an optometrist, gives Priyogopal a badly needed pair of eyeglasses. Another of his ex-pupils, a doctor who provides free medical care after Priyogopal falls down a flight of stairs, chastises Subrata for neglecting his father's material needs.

Meanwhile, Subrata spends his days idly at home and is consumed by suspicion and insecurity.
Subrata finally decides to meet Arati's boss, Himangshu (Haradhan Bannerjee), to ease some of his suspicions. He finds that Himangshu is an affable and friendly person who, like him, hails from Pabna District. They discuss Subrata's unemployment and Himangshu promises to find him a job somewhere.

Edith returns to work after a long illness, but Himangshu doubts she was actually sick and fires her, citing her frivolous lifestyle. Arati discovers her crying and persuades Edith to tell her why she is upset. Despite being the sole breadwinner of the family, the previously timid Arati abandons her inhibitions and confronts Himangshu over his unjust firing of Edith. After a heated exchange in which her boss refuses to apologize to Edith, Arati hands in her resignation letter and storms off.

On her way out of the office, she meets Subrata, apologizes to him for impulsively quitting her job, and admits she is scared of the future. Subarata realizes that his wife has shown courage rather than meekly submitting to her boss to sustain her livelihood. He placates Arati and tells her that he believes some day they both will get jobs to support their family.

Cast
 Madhabi Mukherjee as Arati Mazumdar 
 Anil Chatterjee as Subrata Mazumdar (the husband)
 Haradhan Bannerjee as Himangshu Mukherjee (the boss)
 Vicky Redwood as Edith Simmons (the Anglo-Indian colleague)
 Jaya Bhaduri as Bani (Subrata's sister)
 Haren Chatterjee as Priyogopal (Subrata's father)
 Sefalika Devi as Sarojini (Subrata's mother)
 Prosenjit Sarkar as Pintu (Arati and Subrata's son)

Reception and legacy
Upon its 1967 release in the United States, Mahanagar drew praise from Roger Ebert, Pauline Kael and others. According to Ebert, "the power of this extraordinary film seems to come in equal parts from the serene narrative style of director Satyajit Ray and the sensitive performances of the cast members." He described the film as "one of the most rewarding screen experiences of our time". Bosley Crowther of the New York Times wrote a rave review of the film "There is nothing obscure or over-stylized about this characteristic work by Mr. Ray. It is another of his beautifully fashioned and emotionally balanced contemplations of change in the thinking, the customs and the manners of the Indian middle-class." In his 2013 review Peter Bradshaw of The Guardian gave Mahanagar five stars out of five describing the film as "An utterly absorbing and moving drama about the changing worlds of work and home in 1950s India, and a hymn to uxorious love acted with lightness, intelligence and wit."

The film holds a Rotten Tomatoes score of 92% based on 26 reviews for an average rating of 8.2/10.

Awards
Satyajit Ray won the Silver Bear for Best Director at the 14th Berlin International Film Festival in 1964.

The film was selected as the Indian entry for the Best Foreign Language Film at the 36th Academy Awards, but was not accepted as a nominee.

The film won the All India Certificate of Merit for the Third Best Feature Film in 1963 at the 11th National Film Awards.

The film won first best Filmfare Bengali Movie Award 1963 - R.D. Bhansal

Preservation and restoration
The Academy Film Archive preserved Mahanagar in 1996.
The Criterion Collection released a restored 2K version of the film in 2013.

See also
 List of submissions to the 36th Academy Awards for Best Foreign Language Film
 List of Indian submissions for the Academy Award for Best Foreign Language Film
 Deux jours, une nuit - A film by the Dardenne brothers inspired by Mahanagar

References

External links
  Mahanagar (SatyajitRay.org)
 
 The Guardian review
 The Big City: A Woman’s Place an essay by Chandak Sengoopta at the Criterion Collection

1963 films
1963 drama films
Bengali-language Indian films
Indian drama films
English-language Indian films
Indian black-and-white films
Films based on short fiction
Films about women in India
Films set in Kolkata
Films shot in Kolkata
Films directed by Satyajit Ray
Films with screenplays by Satyajit Ray
Indian feminist films
Third Best Feature Film National Film Award winners
1960s Bengali-language films
Films based on works by Narendranath Mitra